AOD may refer to:

Arts and entertainment

Film
 Army of Darkness, a 1993 film, third in the Evil Dead series

Music
 Adrenalin O.D., a US hardcore punk band
 Act of Depression, the debut album by Underoath
 Art of Dying (band), a hard rock band
 Assembly of Dust, an American rock band
 Aubrey O'Day, an American singer/dancer

Video games
 Tomb Raider: The Angel of Darkness, the 6th game in the Tomb Raider series
 Art of Defense, a type of multiplayer game common in Command & Conquer Generals: Zero Hour
 Astro On Demand, a Hong Kong TVB subscription channel
 Arsenal of Democracy (video game), a grand strategy wargame
 Angels of Death (video game), a Japanese horror adventure game
 Abyss of Darkness, a level in Geometry Dash

Other
 Animation On Display, formerly Anime Overdose and then AOD: The San Francisco Animation Convention

Science and technology
 Acousto-optic deflector, a device for controlling an optical beam
 Advanced Optical Disc, an old name for HD DVD, digital optical media
 Argon oxygen decarburization, a process in stainless steel making
 Automatic Overdrive transmission, a vehicle transmission
 Above Ordnance Datum, a level expressed as a height above mean sea level
 Adult Onset Diabetes, a metabolic disorder, characterized by high blood glucose
 Aerosol Optical Depth, a measure for small particles suspended in the atmosphere
 AMD OverDrive, a software from AMD
 Always on Display, a screen feature of certain smartphones
 Audio on demand, a system for listening to audio content such as radio, podcasts and other streaming media

Other
 Alcohol and Other Drugs (AOD), a social work term
 Alliance of Democracies, non-profit organisation
 Architecture Overview Document, a document related to Solution architecture, details the high-level requirements, principles and constraints that bound to particular project.
 Army Ordnance Department, a forerunner of the British Royal Army Ordnance Corps (RAOC)
 Roman Catholic Archdiocese of Detroit